In mathematics, Felix Klein's -invariant or  function, regarded as a function of a complex variable , is a modular function of weight zero for  defined on the upper half-plane of complex numbers. It is the unique such function which is holomorphic away from a simple pole at the cusp such that

Definition

The -invariant can be defined as a function on the upper half-plane 

with the third definition implying  can be expressed as a cube, also since 1728 = . 

The given functions are the modular discriminant , Dedekind eta function , and modular invariants,

where ,  are Fourier series,

The -invariant can then be directly expressed in terms of the Eisenstein series as,

with no numerical factor other than 1728. This implies a third way to define the modular discriminant,

implying the transcendental numbers,

but yielding the algebraic number (in fact, an integer),

In general, this can be motivated by viewing each  as representing an isomorphism class of elliptic curves. This lattice corresponds to the elliptic curve  (see Weierstrass elliptic functions).

This is due to the corresponding cubic polynomial having distinct roots.

The fundamental region

It can be shown that  is a modular form of weight twelve, and  one of weight four, so that its third power is also of weight twelve. Quotienting out by its centre  yields the modular group, which we may identify with the projective special linear group .

By a suitable choice of transformation belonging to this group,

The function  when restricted to this region still takes on every value in the complex numbers  exactly once. Thus,  has the property of mapping the fundamental region to the entire complex plane.

Class field theory and 
The -invariant has many remarkable properties:

If  is any CM point, that is, any element of an imaginary quadratic field with positive imaginary part (so that  is defined), then  is an algebraic integer. These special values are called singular moduli.
 The field extension  is abelian, that is, it has an abelian Galois group.

These classical results are the starting point for the theory of complex multiplication.

Transcendence properties
In 1937 Theodor Schneider proved the aforementioned result that if  is a quadratic irrational number in the upper half plane then  is an algebraic integer.  In addition he proved that if  is an algebraic number but not imaginary quadratic then  is transcendental.

The  function has numerous other transcendental properties. Kurt Mahler conjectured a particular transcendence result that is often referred to as Mahler's conjecture, though it was proved as a corollary of results by Yu. V. Nesterenko and Patrice Phillipon in the 1990s. Stronger results are now known, for example if  is algebraic then the following three numbers are algebraically independent, and thus at least two of them transcendental:

The -expansion and moonshine

Note that  has a simple pole at the cusp, so its -expansion  has no terms below .

All the Fourier coefficients are integers, which results in several almost integers, notably Ramanujan's constant:

.

,

as can be proved by the Hardy–Littlewood circle method.

Moonshine
This startling observation, first made by John McKay, was the starting point for moonshine theory.

The study of the Moonshine conjecture led John Horton Conway and Simon P. Norton to look at the genus-zero modular functions. If they are normalized to have the form

then John G. Thompson showed that there are only a finite number of such functions (of some finite level), and Chris J. Cummins later showed that there are exactly 6486 of them, 616 of which have integral coefficients.

Alternate expressions
We have

a ratio of Jacobi theta functions , and is the square of the elliptic modulus .

Expressions in terms of theta functions

Define the nome  and the Jacobi theta function,

from which one can derive the auxiliary theta functions. Let,

and modular discriminant,

with Dedekind eta function . The  can then be rapidly computed,

Algebraic definition
So far we have been considering  as a function of a complex variable. However, as an invariant for isomorphism classes of elliptic curves, it can be defined purely algebraically. Let

be a plane elliptic curve over any field. Then we may perform successive transformations to get the above equation into the standard form  (note that this transformation can only be made when the characteristic of the field is not equal to 2 or 3). The resulting coefficients are:

We also have the discriminant

The -invariant for the elliptic curve may now be defined as

In the case that the field over which the curve is defined has characteristic different from 2 or 3, this is equal to

Inverse function
The inverse function of the -invariant can be expressed in terms of the hypergeometric function  (see also the article Picard–Fuchs equation). Explicitly, given a number , to solve the equation  for  can be done in at least four ways.

Then,

then for any of the four roots,

then for any of the three roots,

then,

The latter three methods can be found in Ramanujan's theory of elliptic functions to alternative bases.

The inversion is applied in high-precision calculations of elliptic function periods even as their ratios become unbounded.

Pi formulas

The Chudnovsky brothers found in 1987,

a proof of which uses the fact that

For similar formulas, see the Ramanujan–Sato series.

Special values

The -invariant vanishes at the "corner" of the fundamental domain:

Here are a few more special values given in terms of the alternative notation , the first five well known:

Failure to classify elliptic curves over other fields 
The -invariant is only sensitive to isomorphism classes of elliptic curves over the complex numbers, or more generally, an algebraically closed field. Over other fields there exist examples of elliptic curves whose -invariant is the same, but are non-isomorphic. For example, let  be the elliptic curves associated to the polynomialsboth having -invariant .

On the other hand, on the set of points the equation for  becomes .

References

Notes

Other

. Provides a very readable introduction and various interesting identities.

. Provides a variety of interesting algebraic identities, including the inverse as a hypergeometric series.
 Introduces the j-invariant and discusses the related class field theory.
. Includes a list of the 175 genus-zero modular functions.
. Provides a short review in the context of modular forms.
.

Modular forms
Elliptic functions
Moonshine theory